Andreas "Resi" Franz (27 June 1897 – 2 May 1970) was a German international footballer.

Club career 
He was a prolific goalscorer for SpVgg Fürth in the final rounds of the German football championship. Andreas scored over 724 goals for SpVgg Fürth including friendlies.

Career statistics

International career 
In his fifth international match against Austria Andreas Franz scored a hattrick.

References

External links
 
 
 
 

1897 births
1970 deaths
Association football forwards
German footballers
Germany international footballers
German football managers
Sportspeople from Fürth
Footballers from Bavaria